The major national political parties in the state of Meghalaya are the Indian National Congress (INC) and the Bharatiya Janata Party (BJP).

Major National-Level Parties
 Indian National Congress (INC) led by Rahul Gandhi
 Bharatiya Janata Party (BJP)  led by Narendra Modi

Minor National-Level Parties
 National People's Party (NPP) found by late P. A. Sangma
 All India Trinamool Congress (AITC) led by Charles Pyngrope in Meghalaya
 Nationalist Congress Party (NCP) led by Sharad Pawar

Regional Parties
 United Democratic Party (UDP) found by late B. B. Lyngdoh
 People's Democratic Front (PDF) led by P. N. Syiem and Auspicious L. Mawphlang
 Hill State People's Democratic Party (HSPDP)
 Voice of the People Party (VPP)
 Khun Hynniewtrep National Awakening Movement (KHNAM) led by Pyndapborthiaw Saibon
 Garo National Council (GNC)
 North East Social Democratic Party (NESDP) led by Lamboklang Mylliem
 Meghalaya Democratic Party (MDP) led by S.B. Nongdhar

Defunct Regional Parties
 All Party Hill Leaders Conference (APHLC) {reformed as Hill People's Union}
 All Party Hill Leaders Conference-Armison Marak (APHLC-AM) {merged with UDP}
 Hill People's Union (HPU) {merged into UDP}
 Public Demands Implementation Convention (PDIC) {merged into UDP}
 Meghalaya Progressive Peoples Party (MPPP) {merged into UDP}
 Meghalaya Nationalist Congress Party (MNCP) {merged with Congress}
 Peoples Democratic Movement (PDM) {merged with Congress}
 Khun Hynniewtrep National Awakening Movement (Paul Lyngdoh) (KHNAM-P) {merged with UDP}

References